In Old Cheyenne may refer to:

In Old Cheyenne (1941 film), an American film directed by Joseph Kane
In Old Cheyenne (1931 film), an American film directed by Stuart Paton